Jian River may refer to:

 Jian River (Guangdong) (鉴江)
 Jian River (Sichuan) (湔江)